The Cornelian was a 1914 American automobile built expressly for racing.  It had chain drive and was the smallest such configuration to be raced at the Indianapolis Speedway.

Manufacture

The 1914 Cornelian was manufactured by Howard E. Blood (of the Allegan, Michigan-based Blood Brothers Machine Company), who had joined forces with Swiss racecar driver Louis Chevrolet. Chevrolet did not finish the race, having to drop out on the 77th lap when an engine valve failed (he placed 20th in the results). However, the appearance was good for business, and orders came into Blood's office. However, only a few units had been produced when Blood halted production.

The cycle car was powered by a 4 Cylinder Sterling engine  and boasted a light weight of  displacing 103 cubic inches (1.7 L).  The automobile body was monocoque; the rear wheels had independent suspension, and the front wheels were mounted on a Transverse leaf spring front suspension with a solid axle.

The Museum of American Speed has one of these vehicles on display.

References

External links
1915 Cornelian photo gallery
Article with photo
History of the Town of Allegan
Chevy Has Made History At Indy For More Than 90 Years

Racing cars